Saša Đuričić (born 1 August 1979 in Sarajevo, Yugoslavia) is a retired Croatian football defender who last played for Tavriya Simferopol in the Ukrainian Premier League.

Club career
He had previously played with Serbian FK Hajduk Kula, Croatian NK Uskok Klis, Bosnian NK Široki Brijeg and Ukrainian FC Vorskla Poltava.

External links 
 Official Website Profile of Vorskla Poltava.
 Profile at Playerhistory. 
 
 Profile on Football Squads

1979 births
Living people
Footballers from Sarajevo
Croatian footballers
Croats of Bosnia and Herzegovina
Association football defenders
FK Hajduk Kula players
NK Uskok players
NK Široki Brijeg players
FC Vorskla Poltava players
SC Tavriya Simferopol players
Premier League of Bosnia and Herzegovina players
Ukrainian Premier League players
Croatian expatriate footballers
Expatriate footballers in Serbia
Croatian expatriate sportspeople in Serbia
Expatriate footballers in Ukraine
Croatian expatriate sportspeople in Ukraine